This list is of the Places of Scenic Beauty of Japan located within the Prefecture of Wakayama.

National Places of Scenic Beauty
As of 1 July 2020, twelve Places have been designated at a national level (including one *Special Place of Scenic Beauty); Dorohatchō spans the prefectural borders with Nara and Mie.

Prefectural Places of Scenic Beauty
As of 1 May 2019, eight Places have been designated at a prefectural level.

Municipal Places of Scenic Beauty
As of 1 May 2019, sixteen Places have been designated at a municipal level.

Registered Places of Scenic Beauty
As of 1 July 2020, six Monuments have been registered (as opposed to designated) as Places of Scenic Beauty at a national level.

See also
 Cultural Properties of Japan
 List of parks and gardens of Wakayama Prefecture
 List of Historic Sites of Japan (Wakayama)

References

External links
  Cultural Properties in Wakayama Prefecture

Tourist attractions in Wakayama Prefecture
Places of Scenic Beauty

ja:Category:和歌山県にある国指定の名勝